Fēng (酆) is the 61st name on the Hundred Family Surnames poem. It is derived from the place-name Feng (酆), the name of a fief (in present-day Huyi District, Shanxi province) granted to the 17th son of the virtuous King Wen of Zhou.

References

Individual Chinese surnames